Instinct is a 1999 American psychological thriller film, directed by Jon Turteltaub and starring Anthony Hopkins, Cuba Gooding Jr., George Dzundza, Donald Sutherland, and Maura Tierney. It was very loosely inspired by Ishmael, a novel by Daniel Quinn. In the United States, the film had the working title Ishmael. In 2000, the film was nominated for and won a Genesis Award in the category of feature film. This was the first film produced by Spyglass Entertainment.

Plot

The film examines the mind of anthropologist Ethan Powell who had been missing for a few years, living in the jungle of Uganda's Bwindi Impenetrable Forest with mountain gorillas. He is convicted of killing and injuring several supposed Wilderness Park Rangers in East Africa, and is sent to prison. A bright young psychiatrist, Theo Caulder, tries to find out why he killed them, but becomes entangled in a quest to learn the true history and nature of humankind, stating that civilization has steadily destroyed the natural world, advocating that humans abandon this. Eventually it is revealed that during the course of Powell's stay with the gorillas, they accepted him as part of their group; he was attempting to protect his great ape family when the poachers arrived and started shooting them. He gets a hearing to reveal the truth, but an attack by a vicious guard on another prisoner causes Powell to be reminded of the killed gorillas, at which point he violently attacks the guard to stop him, is restrained and stops talking again. At the end of the film, Powell escapes from prison using a pen to dig out the lock on a window, and heads back to Africa.

Cast
 Anthony Hopkins as Dr. Ethan Powell
 Cuba Gooding Jr. as Dr. Theo Caulder
 Donald Sutherland as Professor Ben Hillard
 Maura Tierney as Lynn Powell
 George Dzundza as Dr. John Murray
 John Ashton as Dacks
 Ivonne Coll as Dr. Marzuez
 John Aylward as Warden Keefer
 Rex Linn as Alan
 Tracey Ellis as Annie
 Marc Macaulay as Foley
 Verne Troyer as Gorilla
 Tory Kittles as Prisoner

Production
In production in 1998. Principal photography began on January 26, and ended on August 8, 1998.

Reception
The film received mixed reviews. Review aggregator Rotten Tomatoes gives the film a critic score of 27% based on reviews from 66 critics. The site's consensus states: "A convoluted and predictable plot overshadows the performances." Metacritic gives the film a weighted average score of 43 out of 100 based on reviews from 23 critics, indicating "mixed or average reviews".

James Berardinelli gave the film 2.5 out 4 describing the film as having "Solid directing and good acting!"

Roger Ebert of the Chicago Sun Times gave the film 1.5 stars out of 4.

Box office
The film was a box-office bomb, grossing only $34,105,207 in the United States and Canada. The film won a Genesis Award for its themes of animal rights.
On the day of the premiere for this film in Orlando, FL, Cuba Gooding, Jr. added his handprints to a star outside of the Chinese Theater at MGM Studios, a park at Walt Disney World.  This walk of fame is a replica of the famous Walk of Fame in Hollywood, California.

Soundtrack

 "Main Title"
 "Into the Wild"
 "Back to the Forest"
 "Everybody Goes"
 "The Killing"
 "The Riot"
 "Escape"
 "End Credits"

References

External links
 
 
 

1999 films
1990s thriller drama films
1990s psychological thriller films
American thriller drama films
American psychological thriller films
Films based on American novels
Films directed by Jon Turteltaub
Films about gorillas
Films shot in Uganda
Spyglass Entertainment films
Touchstone Pictures films
Films scored by Danny Elfman
1999 drama films
1990s English-language films
1990s American films